Dennis Geoffrey Cocke (June 2, 1924 – July 2, 2008) sat as a Member of the British Columbia Legislature as a New Democratic Party member from 1969 to 1986 for the seat of New Westminster.

He grew up on a farm in Athabasca, Alberta and served in the Royal Canadian Air Force during World War II.

Cocke served as Minister of Health under Dave Barrett from 1972 to 1975. In that capacity he created the BC Ambulance Service, replacing a patchwork of private and municipal enterprise with a province-wide system, professional standards and certification, and with newly designed and purpose-built ambulance vehicles. He also led the building of Queen's Park Hospital, and the reconstruction of Royal Columbian Hospital.

He died at the age of 84 at the Royal Columbian Hospital after suffering a stroke.

References

1924 births
2008 deaths
British Columbia New Democratic Party MLAs
Health ministers of British Columbia
Members of the Executive Council of British Columbia
People from Athabasca, Alberta
People from New Westminster
Royal Canadian Air Force personnel of World War II
20th-century Canadian legislators